Anna Kukushkina (born 13 December 1992) is a female sprinter from Russia. She competed in the Women's 200 metres event at the 2015 World Championships in Athletics in Beijing, China.

See also
 Russia at the 2015 World Championships in Athletics

References

External links 

Living people
1992 births
Place of birth missing (living people)
Russian female sprinters
World Athletics Championships athletes for Russia
Russian Athletics Championships winners